Smiebrygga is a neighbourhood in the city of Kristiansand in Agder county, Norway. It is located in the borough of Vågsbygd and in the district of Vågsbygd. Smiebrygga is north of Kjosbukta, south of Auglandskollen, east of Kjosneset, and west of the ocean.

Transportation

References

Geography of Kristiansand
Neighbourhoods of Kristiansand